Ancient Egyptian clothes refers to clothing worn in ancient Egypt from the end of the Neolithic period (prior to 3100 BC) to the collapse of the Ptolemaic Kingdom with the death of Cleopatra in 30 BC. Egyptian clothing was filled with a variety of colors. Adorned with precious gems and jewels, the fashions of the ancient Egyptians were made for not only beauty but also comfort. Egyptian fashion was created to keep cool while in the hot desert.

Elements of Egyptian clothing

In ancient Egypt, linen was by far the most common textile. It helped people to be comfortable in the subtropical heat. Linen is made from the flax plant by spinning the fibers from the stem of the plant. Spinning, weaving and sewing were very important techniques for all Egyptian societies. Plant dyes could be applied to clothing but the clothing was usually left in its natural color. Wool was known, but considered impure. Only the wealthy wore animal fibers that were the object of taboos. They were used on occasion for overcoats, but were forbidden in temples and sanctuaries.

Peasants, workers and other people of modest condition often wore nothing, but the shenti (made of flax) was worn by all people. Slaves often worked naked.

Unique headdresses included the khat, a loose headcloth worn by men of noble rank, and the nemes, a striped cloth reserved for monarchs.

Deities
There were several ancient Egyptian deities related to fabrics, clothing and weaving, chiefly the god Hedjhotep and the goddess Tayt.

Pharaohs
Royal clothing is particularly well documented, as well as the khat, nemes, and crowns of the pharaohs. The pharaohs would often wear animal skins, usually leopard or lion, as a sign of their station.

Men
From about 2130 BC during the Old Kingdom, garments were simply constructed. Men wore wrap around skirts belted at the waist. This style of dress was consistent across class but higher class Egyptians wore more finely crafted pieces.

While women's clothing changed during the Middle Kingdom, men's clothing stayed largely static (as evidenced by available art). The two most notable changes were the pleating of the skirts and the adoption of the triangular apron by upper-class men. This starched ornamented kilt was held up by a sash and worn over a loincloth.

Artistic relics from the New Kingdom show the largest evolution in men's clothing. New Kingdom art depicts the use of sheer blouses with intricately pleated sleeves, as well as more elaborate pleating of the skirts with sheer overskirts. Still, only wealthier citizens could afford these materials

Women

During the Old, Middle and New Kingdom, ancient Egyptian women mostly wore a simple sheath dress called a kalasiris. Women's clothing in ancient Egypt was more conservative than men's clothing. The dresses were held up by one or two straps and were worn down to the ankle, while the upper edge could be worn above or below the breasts. The length of the dress denoted the social class of the wearer. Beading or feathers were also used as an embellishment on the dress. Over the dress, women had a choice of wearing shawls, capes, or robes. The shawl was a piece of fine linen cloth around 4 feet wide by 13 or 14 feet long. This was mostly worn pleated as well.

Until the mid-Eighteenth Dynasty women wore a tight-fitting sheath dress, a simple garment that falls from just below the breasts to just above the ankles, being held up by two shoulder straps. On statues the straps cover the breasts, but in painting and relief the single breast depicted in profile is exposed. The dress hugs the body with no slack. Also when women are shown in movement, sitting or kneeling, the dress still clings to the outline of the body as if elasticated. However most Egyptian clothes were from linen, a material that tends to sag. Surviving dresses consist of a body made from a tube of material sewn up one side, supported not by straps but by a bodice with sleeves. In contrast to dresses shown in art, such linen garments tend to be baggy, and would conceal rather than reveal the body.

Children
Children wore no clothing until 6 years old. Once they turned six they were allowed to wear clothing to protect them from the dry heat. A popular hairstyle among children was the side-lock, an unshaved length of hair on the right side of the head. Even though children usually wore no clothing, they wore jewelry such as anklets, bracelets, collars, and hair accessories.

Wigs

Wigs were worn by the wealthy of both sexes. Made from human hair and sometimes supplemented with date palm fiber, they were often styled in tight curls and narrow braids. For special occasions, both men and women could top their wigs with cones of perfumed fat that would melt to release their fragrance and condition the hair.

Jewelry

Jewelry was very popular in ancient Egypt, no matter the social class. It was heavy and rather voluminous. The main reason for wearing jewelry is because of its aesthetic function. The Egyptians were quite soberly dressed in white linen fabrics, and jewelry offered a possibility for contrast. The Egyptian preference was towards the use of bright colors, lustrous stones and precious metals. Gold was won in large quantities in the eastern desert of Egypt, but also came from Nubia, that was an Egyptian colony for centuries.

On the other hand, silver was rare and was imported from Asia. Therefore, it was silver that was often considered more precious than gold. The eastern desert was also an important source for colorful semi-precious stones such as carnelian, amethyst and jasper. In the Sinai were turquoise mines, the deep blue lapis lazuli had to come from far away Afghanistan. Glass and faience (glaze over a core of stone or sand) were favorites to replace rocks because they could be produced in many colors.

The Egyptians became very skilled when making jewelry from turquoise, metals like gold and silver, and small beads. Both men and women adorned themselves with earrings, bracelets, rings, necklaces and neck collars that were brightly colored. Those who could not afford jewelry made from gold or other stones would make their jewelry from colored pottery beads.

One creation that was specific to ancient Egypt was the gorgerine, an assembly of metal discs worn on the chest, either over bare skin or over a shirt, and attached in the back.

Cosmetics

Embalming allowed the development of cosmetics and perfumes. The perfumes of Egypt were the most numerous, but also the most sought and the costliest of antiquity, which used them extensively. The Egyptians used makeup most of all the ancient people. Nails and hands were painted with henna.

Black kohl, which was used to mark eyes, was obtained from galena. Eye shadow was made from crushed malachite. Red, which was applied to lips, came from ochre. These products were mixed with animal fat to make them compact and to preserve them. Both men and women wore galena or malachite eyeliner to protect the eyes and enhance their beauty.

Findings were published by American Chemical Society in the journal Analytic Chemistry suggest that the use of lead in makeup was intentional. Findings suggest that the lead in combination with salts produced naturally by the body produce nitric oxide which boosts the immune system. It is believed that the production and result were intentional. The increase in immune productivity would help to prevent infections like conjunctivitis.

Footwear
Footwear was the same for both sexes. It consisted of coiled sewn sandals of leatherwork, or for the priestly class, papyrus. Since Egyptians were usually barefoot, sandals were worn on special occasions or at times when their feet might get hurt.

See also
 Biblical clothing
 Clothing in ancient Rome
 Clothing in ancient Greece
 Clothing in the ancient world

References

External links

History of clothing
Clothing
Egypt